The National Provincial Championship, or NPC, was the predecessor to the current Air New Zealand Cup and Heartland Championship in New Zealand rugby. 1977 was the second year of the National Provincial Championship, Canterbury were the winners of Division 1, thus claiming the title of National Champions.

Division 1

Standings

These were the NPC Division 1 standings for the 1977 season.

Table notes
Pld = Played
W   = Win
D   = Draw
L   = Loss
PF   = For (Total points scored)
PA   = Against (Total points scored against)
PD = Points difference
TF = Tries for
Pts = Championship points

Division 2 (North Island)

Standings

Division 2 (South Island)

Standings

Promotion/Relegation
Bay of Plenty and Marlborough finished in the bottom two of Division 1.

The winners of Division 2 North, North Auckland, were automatically promoted to Division 1. Bay of Plenty were relegated, just one season after they won the National Championship.

The winners of Division 2 South, South Canterbury, played Marlborough and won 13-9 to earn promotion to Division 1. Marlborough were relegated to Division 2.

References
 thesilverfern.co.nz (Archived 2009-05-06)

National Provincial Championship
1